The George H. Hauschild Building at 206 N. Liberty in Victoria, Texas was built in 1914.  It was designed by architect Jules Leffland and built by Eugene Tuttle.

It was listed on the National Register of Historic Places (NRHP) in 1986.

It is a two-story brick building that was built for George H. Hauschild's cigar manufacturing firm, with a dwelling unit above. Hauschild operated a ranch in the Victoria area.

It was listed on the NRHP as part of a study which listed numerous historic resources in the Victoria area.

See also

National Register of Historic Places listings in Victoria County, Texas
Recorded Texas Historic Landmarks in Victoria County

References

Commercial buildings on the National Register of Historic Places in Texas
Buildings and structures completed in 1914
Buildings and structures in Victoria, Texas
National Register of Historic Places in Victoria, Texas